Ayala Malls Feliz (also known as Feliz Town Center) is a shopping mall developed and managed by Ayala Malls. It opened on December 21, 2017.

This is Ayala Malls' second mall in Pasig, after Ayala Malls The 30th. It is located along Marcos Highway just near the boundary with Marikina.

Etymology
The word "Feliz" (English: "happy") is a Spanish word, when translated in Tagalog, means "ligaya," which is the name of the intersection where the mall is located.

Features
The mall has four levels, a central garden and events area which makes it the largest mall development by Ayala Malls for the year 2017.

The mall also features traditional amenities such as cinemas and recreational facilities. There is a sky park on the fifth floor that includes shops and restaurants, and it features one of the largest Timezone branches in the country, which opened in April 2018.

The mall features a Metro Department Store and Metro Supermarket as anchor tenants. It also houses global clothing retailers including a two-level H&M store as well as international fitness center Gold's Gym and appliance stores like Automatic Centre.

External links
Ayala Malls Feliz Official website

References

Shopping malls in Pasig
Shopping malls established in 2017
Ayala Malls
2017 establishments in the Philippines